Oxacme marginata is a moth of the subfamily Arctiinae. It was described by George Hampson in 1896. It is found in Myanmar and Assam, India.

References

Cisthenina
Moths described in 1896